To Understand: The Early Recordings of Matthew Sweet is a compilation album by the alternative rock musician Matthew Sweet, released by Hip-O Records in 2002.

Track listing
 "Southern" (The Buzz of Delight)
 "Christmas" (The Buzz of Delight)
 "Briar Rose" (The Buzz of Delight)
 "The Story of Love" (The Buzz of Delight)
 "Ninety-Six Sheets" (The Buzz of Delight)
 "Quiet Her"
 "Blue Fools"
 "We Lose Another Day"
 "Save Time for Me"
 "Something Becomes Nothing" (The Golden Palominos)
 "Easy"
 "When I Feel Again" (Single Remix)
 "Wind and the Sun"
 "Love"
 "Vertigo"
 "Having a Bad Dream"
 "To Understand" (12 Inch B-Side/Demo)
 "You Gotta Love Me" (12 Inch B-Side/Demo)
 "Silent City" (12 Inch B-Side/Demo)
 "Divine Intervention" (12 Inch B-Side/Demo)
 "Good Friend" (Demo)
 "Tainted Obligation" (Demo) (Community Trolls)

References

2002 compilation albums
Matthew Sweet albums
Hip-O Records albums